In cotton ginning, pull-through refers to a method of moving raw cotton in the cotton ginning process using only negative pressure or suction generated by powerful fans attached to the cotton cleaning machinery.  This technique first came into wide use in the late 1980s in the United States.  Samuel Jackson, Lummus, Consolidated, and other industry pioneers were early adopters of the technique.

Prior to the introduction of pull-through systems, the cotton conveying systems in gins required fan(s) at both the beginning of the line pushing the cotton and at the end of the line pulling the cotton through. These systems are known as "push pull systems".

Early experimentation with pull-through systems began by removing sources of high-pressure drop, such as tower dryers. This not only allowed for much higher air volumes, but it eliminated the need for the push fans, making use of more efficient and more powerful fans on the pull side only.

Pull-through layouts quickly increased in popularity because of the several performance advantages they offer. These advantages include that it permits enhanced machinery arrangements at the front end of the cotton ginning process, permits larger drying air volumes with greater horsepower efficiency, allows more forgiving division of cotton flow streams, and offers better cotton gin housekeeping due to natural evacuation of airborne dirt and lint from the building from the suction fans.

Today, a large majority of saw-type cotton gins worldwide use pull-through techniques in at least a portion, if not all of their pneumatic conveying and drying processes.  Note that the term "pull through" is specific to the cotton ginning industry.  Other industries may refer to the same thing as "negative pressure very dilute phase pneumatic conveyance".  

Musicians memorializing the cotton ginning industry have shown a universal preference toward "pull through" over "negative pressure very dilute phase pneumatic conveyance", although there is universal engineering agreement that the latter term is both more articulate and accurate.

Textile machinery
Cotton gin